Axel Pressbutton is a fictional character appearing in comic books. A violent cyborg with the face of Ernest Borgnine, a button on his chest which delivers orgasmic pleasure when pressed, and a phobia about vegetation, he was created by Steve Moore (under the pseudonym "Pedro Henry") and Alan Moore (no relation to Steve Moore), under the pseudonym "Curt Vile".

Publication history 
Axel first appeared in the strip "Three-Eyes McGurk and his Death Planet Commandos", serialized in four issues of the British rock music magazine Dark Star in 1979–1980. Further Axel stories appeared in Sounds in the period 1980–1983; these were mostly written and drawn by "Curt Vile" (Alan Moore). From that period onward, all Axel stories were written by "Pedro Henry" (Steve Moore).

Warrior magazine, launched in 1982, featured Laser Eraser and Pressbutton stories in most issues, mostly drawn by Steve Dillon, in which Pressbutton was partnered with Mysta Mistralis, the "Laser Eraser" (a futuristic hit woman). A few other stories featured the bizarre supporting character Zirk, drawn by such artists as Garry Leach and Brian Bolland. Zirk won the 1983 Eagle Award for Favourite Supporting Character. 

Axel got his own six-issue title in 1984 from Eclipse Comics, which contained reprints of the Axel stories and other back-up material from Warrior. This was followed by a further six issues of Laser Eraser and Pressbutton and a 3-D Special in 1985. This series contained new material written by "Henry" and drawn by Mike Collins.

Axel and Mysta appeared in backup stories in Miracleman issues #9–12 (also published by Eclipse, 1986–1987); later one-off stories appeared in anthology publications, always written by "Henry".

In 2006, British comics artist Jon Haward announced he was drawing a new story featuring  Laser Eraser and Pressbutton. Written by Steve Moore (aka Pedro Henry) and with his approval, the story would go online on Haward's website in October 2006. However, Steve Moore died in 2014 and the story remains unpublished.

Character biography 
Pressbutton's origin was given in a stand-alone story in the Warrior Summer Special (Quality Communications, 1983), drawn by David Jackson. Originally a mild-mannered and plant-loving florist, he took delivery of plant matter which included a sentient, telepathic, anesthetic, carnivorous fungus which attacked his body from the feet upwards. All the time it was consuming him, it was empathising with him, apologising for eating him and preventing him from feeling the pain. By the time he was rescued, the only remaining parts of his body were his head, right arm and part of his chest. As a result of this damage, he became extremely embittered, especially against vegetation. When rebuilt as Pressbutton, he was fitted with a cleaver as a left arm and, because of his lack of genital equipment, an orgasm-inducing button on his chest clearly marked "Press". This was sometimes used by later adversaries to disable him (in rapture) while he was attacking them.

Bibliography 
 "Three-Eyes McGurk and his Death Planet Commandos", serialized in Dark Star #22–25 (1979–1980)– by Pedro Henry and Curt Vile; later reprinted in Rip Off Comix #8 (April 1981)
 "The Stars My Degradation" (a reference to The Stars My Destination), serialized in Sounds (July 12, 1980– March 19, 1983)– Vile wrote and drew the strip from July 12, 1980, to December 1981,  and then again from February 5, 1983, to March 19, 1983; Henry wrote the strip from February 6, 1982, to January 15, 1983; all art by Vile
 "Christmas on Depravity", Sounds (8-page story, December 26, 1981)– story by Pedro Henry and Curt Vile, art by Curt Vile; later reprinted in Warrior #16 (Dec. 1983).
 "The Bride of Pressbutton", Sounds (8-page story, December 25, 1982)– by Pedro Henry and Curt Vile
 Laser Eraser and Pressbutton, in Warrior issues #1–12, 14 (text piece only), 15, 16 (reprint from Sounds), 21, 24–25 (Quality Communications, March 1982–August 1984)– stories by Pedro Henry, art by Steve Dillon (issues #1–3, 6–11), David Jackson (issues #4 and 5), Mick Austin (issue #12), and Alan Davis (issues #21, 24–25)
 Axel Pressbutton (Eclipse Comics, Nov. 1984–July 1985)– by Pedro Henry and Steve Dillon, David Jackson, and Alan Davis; reprints from Warrior
 Laser Eraser and Pressbutton (Eclipse Comics, November 1985–July 1986)– by Pedro Henry and Mike Collins
 3-D Laser Eraser and Pressbutton (Eclipse Comics, August 1986))– by Pedro Henry and Mike Collins
 "Corsairs of Illunium", in Miracleman #9 (Eclipse Comics, July 1986)– by Pedro Henry and Mike Collins
 "Corsairs of Illunium part 2", in Miracleman #10 (Eclipse, Comics, December 1986)– by Pedro Henry and Mike Collins
 "Time after Time", in Miracleman #11 (Eclipse Comics, May 1987)– by Pedro Henry and Mike Collins
 "Time after Time", in Miracleman #12 (Eclipse Comics, September 1987)– by Pedro Henry and Mike Collins
 "A Long Time Dead", in A1 Volume 1 Book #2 (Atomeka Press, 1989)– six-page text story by Pedro Henry, art by Glenn Fabry
 "Famous for Fifteen Minutes", in Blast! #1 (John Brown Publishing, June 1991)– six-page story by Pedro Henry, art by Steve Dillon
 "Axel Pressbutton– The Movie", in A1 Volume 2 Book #3 (Marvel Epic, 1992)– seven pages & cover, story by Pedro Henry, art by Martin Emond & poster page/cover by Simon Bisley

References

External links 
 
 
 Laser Eraser and Pressbutton at the Total Eclipse blog

Pressbutton, Axel
Pressbutton, Axel
Pressbutton, Axel